Kevin Leyton-Brown (born May 12, 1975) is a Professor of Computer Science at the University of British Columbia.  He received his Ph.D. at Stanford University in 2003. He was the recipient of a 2014 NSERC E.W.R. Steacie Memorial Fellowship, a 2013/14 Killam Teaching Prize, and a 2013 Outstanding Young Computer Science Researcher Prize from the Canadian Association of Computer Science. 
Leyton-Brown co-teaches a popular game theory course on Coursera.org, along with Matthew O. Jackson and Yoav Shoham. Leyton-Brown serves as an associate editor for the Journal of Artificial Intelligence Research, the Artificial Intelligence journal, and ''ACM Transactions on Economics and Computation', and was program chair for the ACM Conference on Electronic Commerce in 2012.
Leyton-Brown and coauthors have received the IJCAI-JAIR Best Paper Prize and numerous medals in international SAT competitions (2003–12).

Leyton-Brown's research is at the intersection of computer science and microeconomics, addressing computational problems in economic contexts and incentive issues in multiagent systems. He also studies the application of machine learning to the automated design and analysis of algorithms for solving hard computational problems.

Selected publications

References

External links 
  Leyton-Brown's homepage at the University of British Columbia
 

1975 births
Living people
Canadian computer scientists
Artificial intelligence researchers
Stanford University alumni
Academic staff of the University of British Columbia
Academic journal editors